Mark Horton may refer to:

 Mark Horton (archaeologist) (born 1956), British maritime and historical archaeologist, television presenter and writer
 Mark Horton (bridge) (born 1950), British author, journalist and expert on bridge
 Mary Ann Horton (born Mark R. Horton; 1955), American computer scientist

See also
 Mack Horton OAM (born 1996), an Australian freestyle swimmer